Antonio Ceballos Atienza (31 July 1935 – 21 September 2022) was a Spanish Roman Catholic prelate. 

Ceballos Atienza was born in Spain and was ordained to the priesthood in 1961. He served as bishop of the Roman Catholic Diocese of Ciudad Rodrigo, Spain, from 1988 to 1993 and then was the bishop of the Roman Catholic Diocese of Cádiz y Ceuta, Spain, from 1993 until his retirement in 2011.

References

1935 births
2022 deaths
Spanish Roman Catholic bishops
Bishops appointed by Pope John Paul II
Bishops of Ciudad Rodrigo
Bishops of Cádiz y Ceuta
People from Alcalá la Real